Compagni di scuola (Classmates) is an Italian television comedy series.

Cast

Massimo Lopez: Felice Salina
Paolo Sassanelli: Giovanni Salina
Laura Chiatti: Valeria Filangeri
Camilla Filippi: Arianna Cirese
Cristiana Capotondi: Martina Antonelli
Brando De Sica: Pietro Valobra
Riccardo Scamarcio: Michele Reale
Damiano Russo: Marco Barca
Raffaello Balzo: Ettore
Imma Piro: Marisa Ferrero
Paola Tiziana Cruciani: la bidella Milva Filangeri 
Elisabetta Pellini: Virginia Giovardi 
Rosanna Banfi: Margherita Andreoli  
Valeria Valeri: Mamma Salina

See also
List of Italian television series

External links
 

Italian television series
2001 Italian television series debuts
2001 Italian television series endings
2000s Italian television series
RAI original programming